Ali Khodadadi (born 18 February 1998) is an Iranian footballer who plays as a centre forward who currently plays for Iranian club Zob Ahan in the Persian Gulf Pro League.

Club career

Zob Ahan
He made his debut for Zob Ahan in 4th fixtures of 2018–19 Iran Pro League against Sepahan while he substituted in for Eddie Hernández.

References

1998 births
Living people
Iranian footballers
Sportspeople from Isfahan
Zob Ahan Esfahan F.C. players
Association football forwards